London has centers of worship for many faiths. According to the 2011 Census, the largest religious groupings are Christians (46%), followed by those of no religion (21.7%), Muslims (15%), no response (8.5%), Hindus (5.0%), Jews (1.8%), Sikhs (1.5%), Buddhists (1.0%), and others (0.6%).

Distribution

Christianity in London

Historically, London has been predominantly Christian. This is clear from the large number of churches around the area, particularly in the City of London, which alone contains around 50 churches. Anglicanism is the primary denomination and the Archbishop of Canterbury's main residence is at Lambeth Palace. Most parts of London north of the Thames and west of the River Lee are within the diocese of London under the Bishop of London at the famous St Paul's Cathedral in the City; parishes east of the River Lee are within the Diocese of Chelmsford; and most parts south of the river are administered from Southwark Cathedral as the diocese of Southwark. Important national and royal ceremonies are divided between St. Paul's and Westminster Abbey.

The preeminent Catholic cathedral in England and Wales is Westminster Cathedral, from which the Archbishop of Westminster leads the English and Welsh Catholic churches. Other Christian denominations also have headquarters in the city, including the United Reformed Church, the Salvation Army, and the Quakers, and immigrant communities have established their own denominations or dioceses (e.g. Greek Orthodoxy). Evangelical churches are also present in the city.

The largest nonconformist church is the Metropolitan Tabernacle.

Islam in London 

Islam is London's second largest religion. Muslims account for just over 12.4% of London's population. There were 1,012,823 Muslims reported in the 2011 census in the Greater London area.

London's first mosque was established by Mohamad Dollie in 1895, in modern-day Camden. The Mosque is the focus of a forthcoming documentary with Muslim History Tours. The East London Mosque is the largest Muslim center in central Europe. London Central Mosque is a well-known landmark on the edge of Regent's Park, and there are many other mosques in the city. There are over 1,000 mosques in London, which are expected to outnumber churches by 2030.

Hinduism in London

Over half of the UK's Hindu population lives in London, where they make up 5% of the population. British Hindus primarily live in Western London; however, every borough has a significant Hindu population and as per the 2011 census, the London borough of Harrow has the largest concentration of Hindus at 25%.

The Hindu temple at Neasden was the largest temple of Hinduism in Europe until the opening of the Shri Venkateswara (Balaji) Temple in Tividale in 2006.  Other temples are located in nearby Wembley, Harro,w and Willesden, as well as Wimbledon and Newham in South and East London.

Hare Krishna are sometimes seen on the streets of London, particularly near the Radha Krishna Temple in Soho.

Judaism in London

Over two-thirds of British Jews live in London, which ranks thirteenth in the world as a Jewish population center. There are significant Jewish communities in parts of north London such as Stamford Hill and Golders Green. There are currently two eruvin sin London;:one that covers Hendon, Golders Green, and Hampstead Garden Suburb, and another in Edgware. There are two more planned eruvin;s:one in Stanmore, and one covering Elstree/Borehamwood.

The first written record of Jewish settlement in London dates from 1070, although Jews may have lived there since Roman times. The Bevis Marks Synagogue, built in 1701 in the city of London, is the oldest synagogue in the United Kingdom still in use. In 1899, a map was published showing,by color, the proportion of the Jewish population to other residents of East London, street by street. It illustrates clearly the predominantly Jewish population at the time in the areas of Whitechapel, Spitalfields, and Mile End ,in particular.

Sikhism in London 

London has a sizable Sikh population, most of whom live in the west of the city in areas such as Southall, Hounslow, and Hayes. In southeast London, there are some Sikhs in Bexleyheath, Erith, Sidcup, Plumstead,and Woolwich. In northeast London ,there are some in nNrth Newham and Ilford. In northwest London ,some live in northwest orent and some parts of HHarrow. he largest Sikh temple in London (and Europe) is Gurdwara Sri Guru Singh Sabha in Southall.

Irreligion in London 
Roughly one in five Londoners have no religion, and much of London's civic life and civil society is secular in the sense that it has no religious character.

To the extent that non-religious movements have actively organised in the UK, many organise nationally from London. The non-religious humanist movement in the UK largely begn in London in the 19th century with the foundation of various "ethical churches" and "ethical societies". Over time, these groups came to form the basis of non-religious charities in the UK: Conway Hall, based in the former South Place Ethical Society in Holborn, and Humanists UK, which was formed by the merger of the UK's remaining ethical societies. Of Humanists UK's London chapters, the largest is the Central London Humanist Group, which frequently meets at Conway Hall.

The 19th-century non-religious congregational model of the ethical churches still persists to some extent. The non-religious Sunday Assembly movement began in London in 2013, since becoming a global feel-good movement for non-religious people who want to sing songs and celebrate life. Unitarian groups in Islington and Hackney also now organise under the umbrella of the "New Unity" church, which bills itself as "a non-religious church" and "a radically inclusive church: people of all backgrounds, ages, sexualities, and abilities."

See also

Wembley’s Conference of Living Religions 1924
List of churches in London
Demography of London
Religion in England

External links
Reassessing what we collect website History of minority religions in London with objects and images

References